Mastax senegalensis is a species of beetle in the family Carabidae found in Senegal.

References

Mastax senegalensis
Beetles of Africa
Beetles described in 1934